The Finnish 1st Division (Finnish: I-divisioona) is the second highest level of American football in Finland played under American Football Association of Finland. The title game of the 1st division is called Spagettimalja ("Spaghetti Bowl").

Current teams (2021 season)
Pori Bears
Helsinki ECG
Kotka Eagles
Rovaniemi Nordmen
Tampere Saints

Champions
1983: Oulu Northern Lights
1984: Tampere Rocks
1985: Jyväskylä Rangers
1986: Pori Bears
1987: Hyvinkää Falcons
1988: Vantaa TAFT
1989: Kannelmäki Whips
1990: Porvoo Butchers
1991: Seinäjoki Crocodiles
1992: Tampere Rocks
1993: Vantaa TAFT
1994: Hyvinkää Falcons
1995: Rovaniemi AC Stars
1996: Espoo Colts
1997: Lappeenrannan Rajaritarit
1998: Oulu Northern Lights
1999: Jyväskylä Jaguaarit
2000: Helsinki Wolverines
2001: Porvoo Butchers
2002: Pori Bears
2003: GS Demons
2004: GS Demons
2005: GS Demons
2006: Jyväskylä Jaguaarit
2007: Tampere Saints
2008: Lappeenrannan Rajaritarit
2009: Kuopio Steelers
2010: Vantaa TAFT
2011: Vantaa TAFT
2012: Helsinki 69ers
2013: Turku Trojans
2014: Wasa Royals
2015: Tampere Saints
2016: Hämeenlinna Huskies
2017: Kuopio Steelers
2018: Helsinki Wolverines
2019: Kotka Eagles
2020: UNC Crusaders

American football leagues in Europe
American football in Finland
1983 establishments in Finland
Sports leagues established in 1983